Hyder Chowk (also called Dua Chowk), located in the heart of Hyderabad, Sindh, is a place of political, social and religious importance, with its significance lying in the footsteps of Hyderabad's history. Hyder Chowk was named after Hyder Bux Jatoi, a revolutionary, leftist, peasant leader and the pioneer of Hari movement. With time, the Chowk has expanded from being a political hub to a place lush with people, high-rise buildings and heavy traffic.

History

Formerly, Hyder Chowk was prominently a bus stop with a number of political party offices like Sindh Hari Committee, National Awami Party, Sindhi Awami Tahreek, in the vicinity. A rich number of trade unions like Pakistan Workers Federation, Sindh Peoples Labour Federation and student organisations like Sindh National Students Federation also had their offices set-up here. Its vast space and vicinity to the railway station and bus stand favoured these offices to function efficiently and thus welcomed the gradual transformation of the area into a social and religious hub as well.

The name of the chowk has witnessed great number of changes. It was formerly called Fawaara Chowk, (Fountain Square) as it had a fountain installed in the past. Later the renowned Gol Park was set up which quickly took to becoming a public attraction and a hotspot for political parties to organize and deliver speeches. The park was then transformed into a bus stand interconnecting routes from Mirpurkhas to Hyderabad and vice versa. Later, Hyderabad Municipal Corporation installed a sculpture of praying hands and soon the chowk became popularly known as Dua Chowk. A revolutionary personality and leader, Comrade Hyder Bux Jatoi had his residence nearby and thus the chowk was named Hyder Chowk, to honour the man who spent his time promoting the interests of Haris.

Famous Places
Hyder Chowk is a junction of four different pathways. One leading to Gul Centre Shopping Mall and Dr. NA Baloch Model School, second leading to Resham Bazar, third to Railway Station via Gari Khata and Naya Pul, and fourth and the last leading to Gol Building and Kokhar Mohalla. Owing to its vast area and ease of transportation, the chowk is a common target for every religious rally and undoubtedly we can witness the same in form of an enormous crowd in the first month of Islamic Calendar, Muharram.

The chowk has also developed into a place of economical, educational and judicial importance with large amount of dealings taking place at the main branch of National Bank of Pakistan, sale and resale of books at various local shops such as the historical City Book Depot, and the colony of advocates in addition to the Hyderabad Press Club, Deputy Commissioner House and District Court respectively. Other attractions nearby include -
 Resham Bazaar Situated near Hyder Chowk, Resham Bazaar remains flooded with crowd of people and despite the crowd, the beautiful buildings built in the pre-partitioned era remain an eye-candy for the visitors.
 Sweet Lassi Dairy & Sweet Shop, opposite Cantonese Chinese Restaurant, serves one of the most exotic sweetened Lassi in the entirety of Hyderabad.
 Automobile Workshops and Hotels The neighbourhood is abundant in such facilities and also has a dry-cleaner shop in place to attend to the residential and amenity needs of the visitors.
Printing Shops There are a lot of printing shops are located in Hyder Chowk, Its one of the largest printing industry of Sindh

References

https://www.dawn.com/news/1107803
http://weeklyroshni.com/article/title/1129
http://mahiramajid.blogspot.co.id/2017/03/hyder-chowk-gari-khata-hyderabad.html

Hyderabad District, Pakistan